Lucette may refer to:

 Lucette, a schooner attacked by killer whales

People with the given name
Lucette Aldous (1938–2021), Australian ballet dancer and ballet teacher
Lucette Finas (born 1921), French author and essayist, part of the structuralist movement
Lucette Lagnado, American journalist and memoirist born in Cairo, Egypt
Lucette Michaux-Chevry, the head of the Regional council of the French overseas department of Guadeloupe between 1992 and 2004